Jambin is a rural town and locality in the Shire of Banana, Queensland, Australia.

Geography
Jambin is located in Central Queensland on the Burnett Highway which runs roughly north-south through the town. Callide Creek is immediately to the west of the town; it is a tributary of the Don River.

The  Callide Valley railway line passed through the locality with Jambin railway station serving the town. That section of the line is now closed and the station abandoned. 

However, other parts of the Callide Valley line in Jamin were integrated into the Moura railway line, which serves the mining industry, connecting mines with the Port of Gladstone. The following stations in Jambin are on the Moura line:

 Argoon railway station
Koonkool railway station
Earlsfield railway station 
 Annandale railway station 
Boundary Hill railway station
All of these stations are operational apart from Argoon which is now abandoned. Boundary Hill station is on a balloon loop that serves the Boundary Hill coal mine (in neighbouring Callide).

History
The town takes its name from the Jambin railway station, which in turn was named on  27 April 1923 by the Queensland Railway Department and is believed to be an Aboriginal word meaning echidna.

Callide Provisional School opened on 24 November 1925. On 1 June 1927, it became Callide State School. It closed in 1971. It was on Callide Road. Although it is within the town of Callide, it is within the present-day boundaries of Jambin.

The town first appears on a 1949 survey map.

Jambin was originally established as a supply depot for the railway, which was established in 1924. This opened up the area for new settlers, many of them pursuing dairying. Cream was sent to the butter factory at Wowan.

Jambin Post Office opened on 1 February 1926 (a receiving office had been open from 1924).

Jambin State School opened on 11 February 1929.

The mobile library service commenced in 2004.

The locality of Jambin was created 25 November 2016. The northern part of the new locality was formerly the locality of Smoky Creek and the southern part of the new locality was formerly the locality of Argoon. Therefore, there is no census data available for the locality of Jambing.

Heritage listings
Jambin has a number of heritage-listed sites, including:
 Argoon-Kilburnie Road: Kilbirnie Homestead

Events
Jambin hosts its annual Champagne Campdraft in May each year.

The annual Working Cattle Dog trials are held in June.

Since 2017, the annual King and Queen of CQ Boar Hunting Competition has been held over three days in either late May or early June. In what is claimed to be Australia's largest boar hunting competition, hundreds of competitors compete for prizes in an attempt to cull the boar population while raising money for schools in Jambin and Goovigen. Almost 900 pigs were killed in the 2021 competition which attracted hunters from New South Wales and North Queensland.

Amenities 
Banana Shire Council operate  a fortnightly mobile library service to Jambin and the school.

The Jambin branch of the Queensland Country Women's Association meets in the QCWA Room in the Jambin Hall at 180 Burnett Highway.

In popular culture
The novel "Dust" by Christine Bongers is set around the town of Jambin. In the novel the main character's family, the Vanderbomms, attend church at Jambin.

References

Further reading
 
 
  — includes Upper Don State School, Earlsfield State School, and Greycliffe State School
 

 
Towns in Queensland
Shire of Banana
Localities in Queensland